Paul Antonio is an Australian politician currently serving as the Mayor of Toowoomba, Queensland. Prior to his election to the mayoralty in 2012, Antonio served as Deputy Mayor from 2008 to 2012, and as Mayor of Millmerran Shire Council for eight years until its 2008  amalgamation into the new Toowoomba Region.

References

Mayors of Toowoomba
Living people
Year of birth missing (living people)